The 7th National Geographic Bee was held in Washington, D.C. on May 31, 1995, sponsored by the National Geographic Society. The final competition was moderated by Jeopardy! host Alex Trebek. The winner was Chris Galeczka of Bemis Junior High School in Sterling Heights, Michigan, who won a $25,000 college scholarship. The 2nd-place winner, Aaron Wenzel of Freeport Junior High School in Freeport, Illinois, won a $15,000 scholarship. The 3rd-place winner, Brendan Gordon, a homeschooled student from Moscow, Idaho, won a $10,000 scholarship.

References

External links
 National Geographic Bee Official Website

National Geographic Bee